David Conrad Taylor, BVMS, FRCVS, FZS (11 February 1934 – 29 January 2013), was a British veterinary surgeon.  He was the first veterinary surgeon to specialise in zoo and wildlife medicine.
Taylor worked with zoo and wild animals from 1957, acting as a consultant on the treatment of some of the rarest species on Earth. He was world-renowned as an expert in marine mammal medicine. From 1968, he was the vet in charge of Cuddles, the first captive killer whale to be kept in the UK, at Flamingo Park, North Yorkshire.

Life and career
Taylor was born in Rochdale, Lancashire, and qualified at the University of Glasgow School of Veterinary Medicine in 1956.  He attended the inaugural meeting of the Federation of British Zoos in 1967 which was held at the Zoological Society of London.

He was awarded the first RCVS Fellowship for a wild animal topic (diseases of primates) in 1968, and was recognised as an RCVS specialist in zoo and wildlife medicine, areas to which he made significant contributions. He was the first user of the dart gun in the UK and was the first vet in the country to trial and adopt the newer immobilising drugs for large animals. He was known for inventive and unusual treatments, on one occasion successfully treating a haemorrhaging killer whale by feeding it black puddings.

Taylor worked for zoos across the world. These include Chester Zoo, London Zoo, Chessington Zoo, the now closed Belle Vue Zoological Gardens in Manchester, Flamingo Park Zoo in North Yorkshire, Windsor Safari Park, Parc Astérix near Paris, Marine Land, South of France and Madrid Zoo. He has also worked for some of the most famous circuses in the world.

In 1976 he founded the International Zoo Veterinary Group (IZVG) with his partner Andrew Greenwood and the Dinnes Memorial Veterinary Centre in Santa Clarita, California.  Today, the IZVG is one of the largest and best-known independent zoological veterinary practices in the world.

In March 2008, Taylor retired from the International Zoo Veterinary Practice, though he still acted as a consultant and continued to be a prolific writer until his death.

One by One
In the mid-1970s and early 1980s, Taylor wrote a popular series of autobiographical books that charted his life and experiences as a "Zoo Vet".  These books were adapted for Television in a drama series, One by One.  The BBC made three series and 32 episodes of One By One, broadcast between 1984 and 1987. It was set in the 1950s, with Dudley Zoo doubling as the Great Northern Zoo, and followed the career of Don Turner, based on Taylor himself, as he established himself as wildlife vet. Don Turner was played by Rob Heyland and James Ellis played head keeper Paddy Reilly. Other actors who appeared in the series included Peter Jeffrey, Peter Gilmore and Catherine Schell.

No. 73
Between 1983 and 1988, Taylor made regular appearances on the Saturday morning children's show No. 73. He brought all sorts of exotic animals to the show and would usually be interviewed in these segments by Andrea Arnold. Arnold's character, "Dawn", supposedly worked at Taylor's veterinary surgery for a while. Taylor held several competitions on No. 73, including one in 1987 in which the winner went on a trip to a Madrid Zoo accompanied by himself and "Dawn". In 1984–1985 Taylor and Arnold presented their own programme on Children's ITV, Talking Animal, in which each episode focused on one animal.

Autobiographical books
Zoo Vet: World of a Wildlife Vet (1976) , 
Zoo Vet: Adventures of a Wild Animal Doctor (1977) ,  
Is There a Doctor in the Zoo? (1978) , 
Going Wild: More Adventures of a Zoo Vet (1980) , 
Next panda, please!: Further adventures of a wildlife vet (1982) , 
Wandering Whale and Other Adventures from a Zoo Vet's Casebook (1984) , 
My animal kingdom, one by one (1984) , 
Doctor in the Zoo: Making of a Zoo Vet (1985) , 
Dragon Doctor: Further Adventures from a Zoo Vet's Cases (1986) , 
Vet on the Wild Side: Further Adventures of a Wildlife Vet (1991) , 
The Patient Elephant: more exotic cases from the world's top wildlife vet (1993) , 
Vet on the Wild Side (1998) ,

Other books
The Secret Life of Dogs (2007) , 
The Secret Life of Cats (2007) , 
The Secret Life of Kittens (2008) , 
Collins Family Pet Guide - Rabbit (1999) , 
Collins Small Pet Handbook: Looking after rabbits, hamsters, guinea pigs, gerbils mice and rats (2002) , 
Rabbit Handbook: A Family Guide to Buying (1999) , 
Kitten Taming: The Fast Route to a Controllable Cat (2009) , 
Dogs (DK Pockets) (2003) , 
The Ultimate Dog Book (1990) , 
You and Your Cat (1997) , 
Your Dog's IQ: How Clever Is Your Canine? (2009) , 
The Little Tabby Cat Book (1990) , 
My Dog is a Genius: Understand and Improve Your Dog's Intelligence (2008) , 
Collins Pony Handbook (2002) , 
Old Dog, New Tricks: Understanding and Retraining Older and Rescued Dogs (2006),

References

1934 births
2013 deaths
People from Rochdale
English veterinarians
Alumni of the University of Glasgow
Fellows of the Zoological Society of London